Yaakov Katz (born 1979) is an American-born Israeli journalist and author who currently serves as the Editor-in-Chief of The Jerusalem Post.

Career 
Katz completed a law degree from Bar Ilan University in 2007, and in 2013, was selected as an outstanding alumnus.

From 2003 to 2013 Katz was the military correspondent and defense analyst for The Jerusalem Post, and has also worked as the Israel correspondent for Jane's Defence Weekly and USA Today. His writings have also appeared in the Washington Post, New York Post, Daily Beast, Al Jazeera English, Israel Defense, Newsmax, Special Operations Report, Fair Observer and other publications.

In 2012-2013, Katz was one of 12 international fellows to spend a year at the Nieman Foundation for Journalism at Harvard.

In 2013 Katz became a Senior Foreign Policy Advisor to Israel's Minister of Education and Diaspora Affairs Naftali Bennett.

He became Editor-in-Chief at The Jerusalem Post in 2016.

His first book, Israel vs. Iran: The Shadow War, which Katz co-authored with Yoaz Hendel was published by Potomac Books in 2012 in the US and by Kinneret Zmora-Bitan in Israel, where it spent several weeks on the bestseller list.

His second book, Weapons Wizards, written together with veteran Walla News military correspondent Amir Bohbot was published by St. Martin's Press in the Winter of 2017 and tells the behind-the-scenes story of how Israel invented its revolutionary weapons and military technology. It has been translated in Czech, Polish, Hebrew and Mandarin.

His most recent book Shadow Strike: Inside Israel's Secret Mission to Eliminate Syrian Nuclear Power was published in May 2019 by St. Martin's Press. It was chosen as a finalist for the Sami Rohr Prize for Jewish Literature.

Katz has lectured at dozens of college campuses across the US and is a frequent speaker on issues relating to Israeli security and Middle East politics.

Personal life 

Originally from Chicago, Katz moved to Israel in 1996. He lives in Jerusalem with his wife and their four children.

Bibliography
Israel vs. Iran: The Shadow War, with Yaoz Hendel (Zmora -Bitan Books, April 2011, Potomac Books 2012) Google Books
The Weapon Wizards: How Israel Became a High-Tech Military Superpower, with Amir Bohbot (St. Martin's Press, January 2017)
Shadow Strike: Inside Israel's Secret Mission to Eliminate Syrian Nuclear Power (St. Martin's Press, May 2019)

References

Living people
1979 births
People from Chicago
Jewish American journalists
20th-century American Jews
American emigrants to Israel
Israeli journalists
Israeli civil servants
Bar-Ilan University alumni
Harvard University alumni
The Jerusalem Post editors